Jimtown is an unincorporated community in Morgan County in the U.S. state of West Virginia. Because of its proximity to the north of the Town of Bath (Berkeley Springs) limits, Jimtown is generally considered a neighborhood of Berkeley Springs. The community is also referred to as Jimstown.

References

Unincorporated communities in Morgan County, West Virginia
Unincorporated communities in West Virginia